Somoza Celestin (born 7 January 1973) is a Haitian judoka. He competed in the men's middleweight event at the 1996 Summer Olympics.

References

1973 births
Living people
Haitian male judoka
Olympic judoka of Haiti
Judoka at the 1996 Summer Olympics
Place of birth missing (living people)